New Tattoo is the eighth studio album by the American heavy metal band Mötley Crüe, released in 2000. Artistically, New Tattoo shows the band returning to the earlier musical style that gave them commercial success in the 1980s and early 1990s. This is the only album by the band not to feature drummer Tommy Lee, who left the band a year before, and was replaced by former Ozzy Osbourne drummer Randy Castillo on the album.

The album artwork was inspired by the cover of Bruce Dickinson's album Tattooed Millionaire, whose title track is said to be about Dickinson's wife cheating on him with bassist Nikki Sixx, as revealed in Mötley Crüe's biography The Dirt.

Background 
The original line up of Mötley Crüe, which consisted of singer Vince Neil, bassist Nikki Sixx, drummer Tommy Lee and guitarist Mick Mars, had reunited for the Generation Swine album and tour in 1997, mainly out of pressure from their management and record company. Even though the group had reunited, problems still existed between Lee and Neil, as Lee felt that the band had been going in a backward direction since Neil rejoined the group. Lee was also having domestic problems with his wife, model Pamela Anderson, which, after an altercation following an argument, led to him serving time in jail.

During this time, Mötley Crüe and Elektra Records severed their 17-year relationship together, with Mötley Crüe gaining full ownership of its music catalog and publishing rights. The break with Elektra allowed the group to form its own label, Mötley Records, to release future projects on.

Lee's legal problems forced the band to decline invitations from Ozzfest and various radio festivals, though the band managed to record two new songs for their 1998 Greatest Hits album, "Bitter Pill" and "Enslaved," which were more in vein of their 1980s output compared to their work during the 1990s.

While Lee was in jail, he decided that he was going to leave Mötley Crüe and start his own project, which eventually became Methods of Mayhem. Lee stayed with the group for the tour of their greatest hits album, but after each show he would retreat to his portable studio and work on material for his new project. With Lee out of the band, the band hired Randy Castillo, who had previously performed with Lita Ford and Ozzy Osbourne, as his replacement.

Recording 
Mötley Crüe teamed up with producer Mike Clink to record the album that Sixx felt should have been the successor to their 1989 album, Dr. Feelgood.

Release 
New Tattoo debuted at No. 41 on the Billboard 200 and slid down shortly after. According to Nielsen SoundScan, the album has sold about 203,000 copies in the U.S. to date. The songs "Hell on High Heels", which featured a music video and charted at number 13 on the Mainstream rock charts, "New Tattoo" and "Treat Me Like the Dog I Am" were released as singles for the album.

Touring and aftermath 
Right before the tour in support of the album, Castillo fell ill with a duodenal ulcer. Hole drummer Samantha Maloney filled in for the tour. While recovering from stomach surgery, Castillo was diagnosed with Squamous cell Carcinoma. After Castillo's death in March 2002, Mötley Crüe went on hiatus until their 2004 reunion, with Tommy Lee back in the fold.

None of the songs from the album were played live again after the tour ended; With the exception of one performance of "White Punks on Dope" in 2005.

Track listing

Lewd, Crüed & Tattooed DVD
Lewd, Crüed & Tattooed is a Mötley Crüe concert DVD released in 2001, the concert was recorded live in Salt Lake City on their 2000 tour supporting the "New Tattoo" album. The DVD also features behind the scenes footage and the music video for the single "Hell on High Heels".

DVD Track listing
 "Kickstart My Heart" 
 "Same Ol' Situation (S.O.S.)" 
 "Primal Scream" 
 "Punched in the Teeth by Love" 
 "Dr. Feelgood" 
 "Home Sweet Home" 
 "Don't Go Away Mad (Just Go Away)"
 "Piece of Your Action" 
 "Wild Side" 
 "Hell on High Heels" 
 "Looks That Kill" 
 "Girls, Girls, Girls" 
 "Live Wire" 
 "White Punks on Dope" 
 "Shout at the Devil '97"
 "Hell on High Heels" (music video)

Personnel

Mötley Crüe
 Vince Neil – vocals
 Mick Mars – guitars
 Nikki Sixx – bass
 Randy Castillo – drums

Additional musicians
 Samantha Maloney – drums (live disc only)

Production
 Mike Clink – producer, engineer, mixing at Sol Seven Recording and A&M Studios
 Ed Thacker – engineer, mixing
 Billy Kinsley, Ethan Mates, Jon Krupp, Jaime Sickora, Frank Montoya – assistant engineers
 Tal Herzberg, Rail Rogut, Karl Derfler – digital editing
 Dave Collins – mastering
 Erik Casillas – cover art
 Susan McEowen – art direction
 Jim Purdum – photography

Charts

Album

Singles

Certifications
DVD

References 

Mötley Crüe albums
2000 albums
Albums produced by Mike Clink
Eleven Seven Label Group albums
2001 video albums